San Agustin Academy (SAGA) is a Catholic private institution located near the Panglao Shore, beside St. Augustine Church of Panglao, in Poblacion. It is run by the Diocese of Tagbilaran-BACS-Bohol Association of Catholic Schools. It is the oldest high school institution of Panglao Town.

References

Schools in Bohol
Catholic secondary schools in the Philippines
1949 establishments in the Philippines
Educational institutions established in 1949